Hillsboro is a city in and the county seat of Highland County, Ohio, United States approximately 35 mi (56 km) west of Chillicothe, and 50 miles east of Cincinnati. The population was 6,605 at the 2010 census.

History

Hillsboro was platted in 1807, and most likely named for the hills near the original town site.  One of the late 19th century's largest reform organizations, the Woman's Christian Temperance Union that went on to play important roles in achieving women's suffrage and prohibition, was founded in Hillsboro in 1873.

Geography

Hillsboro is located at the junction of U.S. Routes 50 and 62 and State Routes 73, 124, 138, and 247.

Climate

Demographics

2010 census
As of the census of 2010, there were 6,605 people, 2,755 households, and 1,612 families living in the city. The racial makeup of the city was 90.0% White, 5.8% African American, 0.3% Native American, 0.8% Asian, 0.2% from other races, and 2.9% from two or more races. Hispanic or Latino of any race were 1.3% of the population.

There were 2,755 households, of which 30.5% had children under the age of 18 living with them, 37.7% were married couples living together, 16.5% had a female householder with no husband present, 4.3% had a male householder with no wife present, and 41.5% were non-families. 37.1% of all households were made up of individuals, and 18.2% had someone living alone who was 65 years of age or older. The average household size was 2.28 and the average family size was 2.97.

The median age in the city was 38.7 years. 24.3% of residents were under the age of 18; 9.1% were between the ages of 18 and 24; 24.1% were from 25 to 44; 22.4% were from 45 to 64; and 20.1% were 65 years of age or older. The gender makeup of the city was 44.9% male and 55.1% female.

2000 census
As of the census of 2000, there were 6,368 people, 2,686 households, and 1,633 families living in the city. The population density was 1,227.1 people per square mile (473.7/km2). There were 2,971 housing units at an average density of 572.5 per square mile (221.0/km2). The racial makeup of the city was 90.58% White, 6.39% African American, 0.20% Native American, 1.07% Asian, 0.03% Pacific Islander, 0.38% from other races, and 1.35% from two or more races. Hispanic or Latino of any race were 0.94% of the population.

There were 2,686 households, out of which 28.6% had children under the age of 18 living with them, 43.8% were married couples living together, 13.6% had a female householder with no husband present, and 39.2% were non-families. 35.8% of all households were made up of individuals, and 18.2% had someone living alone who was 65 years of age or older. The average household size was 2.26 and the average family size was 2.93.

In the city, the population was spread out, with 24.2% under the age of 18, 9.9% from 18 to 24, 23.9% from 25 to 44, 20.7% from 45 to 64, and 21.3% who were 65 years of age or older. The median age was 39 years. For every 100 females, there were 82.8 males. For every 100 females age 18 and over, there were 75.9 males.

The median income for a household in the city was $25,998, and the median income for a family was $34,750. Males had a median income of $30,984 versus $22,665 for females. The per capita income for the city was $15,400. About 13.5% of families and 18.1% of the population were below the poverty line, including 27.6% of those under age 18 and 11.7% of those age 65 or over.

Economy
Hillsboro has produced steel alloy bells, which were shipped around the world.

Arts and culture
Since 1976 the city hosts the "Festival of the Bells" during the fourth of July weekend.

Hillsboro has a public library, a branch of the Highland County District Library.

Education

Hillsboro City Schools operates two public elementary schools, one middle school, and Hillsboro High School. Parochial schools in Hillsboro include Hillsboro Christian Academy and St. Mary Catholic Elementary School.

The Central Campus of Southern State Community College is located within the city.

Media

Newspapers
The Highland County Press — weekly
The Times-Gazette — daily except Sunday and Monday

Radio
 WLRU-LP - Catholic programming
 WSRW — country music format

Notable people
 John J. Ballentine, U.S. Navy admiral
 R. N. Baskin, mayor of Salt Lake City (1892 – 1895)
 Milton Caniff, cartoonist (Terry and the Pirates, Steve Canyon)
 Joe Crawford, Major League Baseball Player
 Jonas R. Emrie, U.S. Representative, and postmaster of Hillsboro (1939 - 1941)
 Hugh Fullerton, sportswriter who exposed the 1919 Black Sox Scandal
 Drew Hastings, comedian and former mayor of the city
 Joseph J. McDowell, U.S. Representative
 Bob McEwen, U.S. Representative (1981 - 1993)
 William H. McSurely, Illinois state legislator and judge
 Jacob J. Pugsley, U.S. Representative
 Moses F. Shinn, Methodist Episcopal Church minister
 John Armstrong Smith, U.S. Representative (1869 - 1873)
 Eliza Thompson, temperance advocate who inspired the founding of the Woman's Christian Temperance Union.
 Allen Trimble, 8th & 10th Governor of Ohio (1822, 1826 - 1830)
 Kirby White, MLB player
 Wilbur M. White, U.S. Representative
 Jimmy Yeary, country singer and songwriter

References

External links

 City of Hillsboro

 
Cities in Highland County, Ohio
County seats in Ohio
Cities in Ohio